Caballo is a census-designated place in Sierra County, New Mexico, United States. Its population was 112 as of the 2010 census. Caballo has a post office with ZIP code 87931. The community is located along New Mexico State Road 187, north and south of Exit 63 on Interstate 25.

Caballo was founded in 1908, when John Gordon and his extended family homesteaded here. It was named after the mountains to the east. A post office was established in 1916. In 1938, the Caballo Dam was constructed, creating a lake which forced residents to re-establish the community to the west. The lake is host to Caballo Lake State Park.

Geography
The area stretches for over five miles and includes an active fire department and many businesses, and residences. It borders Caballo Lake State Park.

Demographics

Education
Truth or Consequences Municipal Schools is the school district for the entire county. Truth or Consequences Middle School and Hot Springs High School, both in Truth or Consequences, are the district's secondary schools.

References

External links
Caballo Lake State Park on the Sierra County Tourism website

Census-designated places in New Mexico
Census-designated places in Sierra County, New Mexico